Lymeswold cheese (1982–1992) was an English cheese variety. Although many English cheeses are named after regions, Lymeswold's name was the result of a public competition to name it; the winning name may have been derived from an English place name Wymeswold. The cheese was a soft, mild blue cheese with an edible white rind, much like Brie, and was inspired by French cheeses. It was similar to non-branded cheeses sold as Blue Brie. At the time of its launch, it was hailed as "the first new English cheese in 200 years". For the export market, the cheese was branded Westminster Blue, because some non-English speakers had difficulty pronouncing the name Lymeswold.

Origins
In 1979 the Milk Marketing Board began discussions with the large dairy firm Unigate that led in 1981 to the restructuring of its processing and marketing activities under the Dairy Crest brand to use surplus milk production for making other dairy products.  The initiatives that followed included the launch in 1982 of Lymeswold cheese. The name was derived from public competition to name the new cheese. It was at first produced at Cannington creamery in Somerset. The cheese's creation was hailed by Peter Walker, then Agriculture Minister, who said it would improve the balance of payments by replacing imports and becoming "one of our most successful cheese exports".

Rise and fall
The concept of Lymeswold was created by an advertising agency, Butler Dennis & Garland, in response to a brief from the Milk Marketing Board to make use of more milk.  It was conceived after a review of upcoming types, where soft blue cheese seemed to be missing from the UK's indigenous repertoire. The village of Lymeswold was created as part of the brand idea.  With heavy promotion and a very successful branding exercise, initial demand for Lymeswold exceeded supply. It has been suggested that the Board then released maturing stocks before they were ready, which gave the cheese a reputation for poor quality. Certainly the initial success of the cheese did not turn into steady long-term sales. It was later subjected to strong competition from Cambozola, a German cheese, and eventually ceased production in 1992. Dairy Crest said at the time that it "could not sustain demand". John Withley, then the restaurant critic of the Daily Telegraph, welcomed the news with "unfettered joy", saying it had always been "an artificial cheese".

Continued influence
The name Lymeswold has lived on as one of many recurring jokes in Private Eye, including calling it Slymeswold and its reputation as a cure for herpes.

See also
 List of British cheeses

References 

English cheeses
Blue cheeses
1982 establishments in the United Kingdom
1992 disestablishments in the United Kingdom
Products and services discontinued in 1992